Bhadur Hussain is a village in Batala in Gurdaspur district of Punjab State, India. The village is administrated by Sarpanch an elected representative of the village.

Demography 
, The village has a total number of 402 houses and the population of 2209 of which 1196 are males while 1013 are females according to the report published by Census India in 2011. The literacy rate of the village is 75.87%, highest than the state average of 75.84%. The population of children under the age of 6 years is 274 which is 12.40% of total population of the village, and child sex ratio is approximately 734 lower than the state average of 846.

See also
List of villages in India

References 

Villages in Gurdaspur district